The 2013 WPA World Nine-ball Championship was the 22nd event in the annual WPA World Nine-ball Championship. The event took place from September 2 to 13, 2013 in Doha, Qatar.

Germany's Thorsten Hohmann became world champion by a 13–6 victory over Philippine Antonio Gabica, in the final. This was Hohmann's second 9-ball World championship, having also won the 2003 WPA World Nine-ball Championship. Hohmann defeated defending champion Darren Appleton in an early stage of the event.

Format
The 128 participating players were divided into 16 groups, in which they competed in a double elimination tournament against each other. The remaining 64 players in each group qualified for the final round played in the knockout system.

Prize money
The event's prize money stayed similar to that of the previous years, with winner Thorsten Hohmann winning $36,000.

Results

Preliminary round
The following 32 players won once in the preliminary round and lost twice, which means early retirement and places 65 to 96:

The following 32 players lost twice in the preliminary round, which means early retirement and places 97-128.

Knockout round

References

External links
Tournament at azbilliards.com

2013
WPA World Nine-ball Championship
WPA World Nine-ball Championship
International sports competitions hosted by Qatar
Sports competitions in Doha